Alexandra Hill may refer to:

People
 Alex Hyndman, British journalist
 Alexandra Hill Tinoco, Salvadorian politician

Places
 Alexandra Hill, Singapore
 Alexandra Hills, Queensland

See also
 Al Hill (disambiguation)
 Alex Hill (disambiguation)
 Alexander Hill (disambiguation)
 Hill (surname)
 

Hill, Alexandra